Jordanoleiopus polymistus is a species of beetle in the family Cerambycidae. It was described by William Lucas Distant in 1905.

References

Polymistoleiopus
Beetles described in 1905
Taxa named by William Lucas Distant